Cheers is an American situation comedy. It has won and been nominated for a variety of different awards, including 13 Emmy Award nominations for its first season alone, the most nominations a comedy series had ever received at that time. The show went on to receive a total of 179 Primetime Emmy nominations, winning a total of 28 over the course of its eleven seasons.

American Comedy Awards

Directors Guild of America Awards

Emmy Awards
Cheers received 117 Emmy Award nominations over its eleven seasons.

Primetime Emmy Awards

 James Burrows, Glen Charles, Les Charles, David Isaacs, Ken Levine

 James Burrows, Glen Charles, Les Charles

 James Burrows, Glen Charles, Les Charles, Ken Estin, Sam Simon

 James Burrows, Glen Charles, Les Charles, Peter Casey, David Lee, Heide Perlman, David Angell, Tim Berry

 James Burrows, Glen Charles, Les Charles, Peter Casey, David Lee, David Angell, Tim Berry

 James Burrows, Glen Charles, Les Charles, Peter Casey, David Lee, David Angell, Phoef Sutton, Tim Berry

 James Burrows, Glen Charles, Les Charles, Peter Casey, David Lee, David Angell, Phoef Sutton, Tim Berry, Andy Ackerman

 James Burrows, Glen Charles, Les Charles, Cherie Steinkellner, Bill Steinkellner, Phoef Sutton, Tim Berry, Andy Ackerman, Brian Pollack, Mert Rich, Dan O'Shannon, Tom Anderson, Larry Balmagia

 James Burrows, Glen Charles, Les Charles, Cherie Steinkellner, Bill Steinkellner, Phoef Sutton, Dan O'Shannon, Tom Anderson, Tim Berry, Dan Staley, Rob Long

 James Burrows, Glen Charles, Les Charles, Dan O'Shannon, Tom Anderson, Rob Long, Dan Staley, Tim Berry

Creative Arts Emmy Awards

Golden Globe Awards

References

General

Specific

External links
 List of awards on IMDb

Cheers
Awards